The Whidbey Formation is a geologic formation in Washington (state). It preserves fossils.

See also

 List of fossiliferous stratigraphic units in Washington (state)
 Paleontology in Washington (state)

References
 

Geologic formations of Washington (state)